Chiqua is a monotypic moth genus of the family Crambidae described by Stanisław Błeszyński in 1970. It contains only one species, Chiqua eblisella, described in the same article, which is found in Bolivia.

References

Monotypic moth genera
Crambidae genera
Taxa named by Stanisław Błeszyński
Chiloini